Torrazza Coste is a comune (municipality) in the Province of Pavia in the Italian region Lombardy, located about  south of Milan and about  southwest of Pavia.

Torrazza Coste borders the following municipalities: Borgo Priolo, Codevilla, Montebello della Battaglia, Retorbido, Rocca Susella.

Demographic evolution

References

Cities and towns in Lombardy